Benjamin Sylvester Blacknall (September 26, 1946 – April 25, 2012) was an American football player and coach also former sergeant (Sgt.) in the Air Force. He served as the head football coach for Delaware Hornets at Delaware State University from 2000 to 2003, compiling a record of 16–24. He was fired midway through the 2003 season after Delaware State lost their first six games. Blacknall played college football for North Carolina A&T Aggies at North Carolina A&T University under the guidance of Willie Jeffries. Blacknall lettered at A&T from 1968 to 1971, graduating with a bachelor's degree in 1975. Blacknall was mentor to Anthony Jones, who had played for Wichita State under his guidance and recruited Blacknall to Morehouse in 1999.

Awards and honors

Mid-Eastern Athletic Conference
 MEAC Defensive Player of the Year (1971, 1972)
 MEAC Coach of the Year (2000)

North Carolina A&T Sports Hall of Fame
 Hall of Fame Inductee (2000)

100 percent Wrong Club of Atlanta
 Coach of the Year (2000)

Head coaching record

Notes

References

External links
 

1946 births
2012 deaths
Alabama A&M Bulldogs football coaches
Delaware State Hornets football coaches
Howard Bison football coaches
Morehouse Maroon Tigers football coaches
North Carolina A&T Aggies football coaches
North Carolina A&T Aggies football players
South Carolina State Bulldogs football coaches
Wichita State Shockers football coaches
African-American coaches of American football
African-American players of American football
20th-century African-American sportspeople
21st-century African-American sportspeople